Miguel Angel Medina (born 8 April 1941) is a Mexican weightlifter. He competed at the 1968 Summer Olympics and the 1972 Summer Olympics.

References

1941 births
Living people
Mexican male weightlifters
Olympic weightlifters of Mexico
Weightlifters at the 1968 Summer Olympics
Weightlifters at the 1972 Summer Olympics
People from Mérida, Yucatán
20th-century Mexican people
21st-century Mexican people